Merlin is a 2018 Indian Tamil fantasy film written and directed by Keera. The film features Vishnu Priyan and Ashwini Chandrashekar in the lead roles, while Jeeva, Singampuli and Aadukalam Murugadoss play other pivotal roles. Featuring music by Ganesh Raghavendra, the venture began production in early 2016 and was released on 23 February 2018.

Cast

 Special appearances in the song "Ain't No Sunshine" in order of appearance

Production
Director Keera announced that Merlin would be his second film after Pachai Engira Kaathu during late 2015, with production beginning thereafter. Vishnu Priyan was signed as the lead actor, while Kannada actress Ashwini Chandrashekar joined the cast to play the lead actress. Though it was the first Tamil film she signed up for, two other Tamil films ended up releasing earlier. Supporting actors including Lollu Sabha Jeeva, Aadukalam Murugadoss, Singampuli and Powerstar Srinivasan also worked on the film, while prominent cinematographer Thangar Bachan also worked as an actor.

At the film's audio launch in September 2016, Keera announced that Attakathi Dinesh would portray himself in the film in a guest appearance. The event was attended by directors including Pa. Ranjith, Vasanthabalan and Thangar Bachan.

Soundtrack

The film's music was composed by Ganesh Raghavendra, with five different lyricists working on the album. The soundtrack was released on 28 June 2017 through TrendMusic. A version of the English song "Ain't No Sunshine" by Bill Withers from his 1971 album Just As I Am was included in the soundtrack of Merlin, with Aadukalam Murugadoss rendering the version. The song was used as a promotional track for the film, with actors such as Chaams, Aadukalam Naren, Aadhi, Vemal, Guru Somasundaram, Ma Ka Pa Anand, Shakthi Vasu, Priyamani and Vijay Sethupathi appearing in the making video.

Critical reception
New Indian Express felt that film lacked realism and the editing is completely abrupt.

Controversy
Praveena filed a case and sought to stop the film from being screened as she felt that film contains dialogue which degrades women.

References

External links

2018 films
2010s Tamil-language films
Indian horror films